Milton Douglas "Buck" West (August 29, 1860 – January 13, 1929) was a Major League Baseball outfielder. West played for the Cincinnati Red Stockings in 1884 and the Cleveland Spiders in 1890. Both seasons were ones with three major leagues.

West played for the Northwestern League champion Saginaw Old Golds in early 1884. After the league folded, he joined the Red Stockings.

West was the first major leaguer ever to hit a home run in his final at bat.

After his baseball career ended, West went into the retail liquor business and also engaged in a restaurant enterprise.

See also
List of Major League Baseball players with a home run in their final major league at bat

References

External links
 Baseball-Reference.com

1860 births
1929 deaths
Major League Baseball outfielders
Cleveland Spiders players
Cincinnati Reds players
19th-century baseball players
East Saginaw Grays players
Oswego Sweegs players
Oswego Starchboxes players
Binghamton Crickets (1880s) players
Columbus Senators players
Lima Lushers players
Wheeling National Citys players
Wheeling Nailers (baseball) players
Minneapolis Millers (baseball) players
Saginaw-Bay City Hyphens players
Syracuse Stars (minor league baseball) players
Albany Senators players
Macon Central City players
Macon Hornets players
Wilkes-Barre Coal Barons players
Detroit Creams players
Columbus Statesmen players
Baseball players from Ohio